Nesbit Willoughby Wallace (20 April 1839 − 31 July 1931) was a Canadian officer and first-class cricketer. Wallace was a right-handed batsman who bowled right-arm slow underarm.

Cricket
Wallace made his first-class debut in the 1863 for the Gentlemen of the South against Surrey.

In 1871 Wallace represented Gloucestershire in two first-class matches against Surrey and Nottinghamshire.

Wallace represented Hampshire thirteen years later in a single first-class match against Kent.

Wallace's final first-class match came against the Marylebone Cricket Club in 1885.

Wallace represented his native Canada in a match against Philadelphia, as well as playing against them with the British Army.

Military
Wallace was an officer in the 60th (King's Royal Rifle Corps) Regiment of Foot, and retired with the rank of lieutenant-colonel and honorary colonel. He wrote a history of the regiment in 1879.

Towards the end of the Second Boer War, a regiment was formed as part of the Imperial Yeomanry in November 1901, known as the 4th County of London Imperial Yeomanry (King's Colonials), with the Prince of Wales (later King George V) as honorary colonel and lieutenant-colonel Wallace as its first commanding officer. It was composed of four squadrons of colonial volunteers resident in London – one of Asians (British Asian Squadron), one of Canadians (British American Squadron), one of Australasians (Australasian Squadron), and one of South Africans and Rhodesians (British African Squadron). A New Zealand squadron was later formed, with the Australasian squadron being redesignated as Australian. As the war drew towards a close, the regiment never saw action in South Africa. Wallace was granted the honorary rank of colonel on 2 December 1902.

Wallace died in Guildford, Surrey on 31 July 1931, at the age of 92.

References

External links
Nesbit Wallace at Cricinfo
Nesbit Wallace at CricketArchive

1839 births
1931 deaths
Sportspeople from Halifax, Nova Scotia
Canadian cricketers
Gloucestershire cricketers
Hampshire cricketers
Marylebone Cricket Club cricketers
Cricketers from Nova Scotia
Gentlemen of the South cricketers
King's Royal Rifle Corps officers
Canadian military personnel from Nova Scotia
19th-century British Army personnel